is a railway station in Nanae, Hokkaidō Prefecture, Japan.

Lines
Hokkaido Railway Company
Hakodate Main Line Station H72

Adjacent stations

Railway stations in Hokkaido Prefecture
Railway stations in Japan opened in 1950